This is a list of notable Hongkongers, sorted by their last name in alphabetical order.

A
David Akers-Jones, British colonial administrator, Chief Secretary of Hong Kong (1985 to 1987), Acting Governor of Hong Kong (1986-1987), Hong Kong Affairs Advisor
Jamie Atkinson, cricketer, Hong Kong cricket team
Au Wai Lun, footballer, Hong Kong National Representative
Au Chi-wai, Hong Kong amateur snooker player
Jin Au-Yeung, rapper (American Chinese)

B
Clara Blandick (1876-1962), American theater and film actress
Bob's Your Uncle, YouTuber who makes videos about cooking and travelling

C 
 Albert Chan, politician
 Anson Chan, politician and former civil servant 
 Edith Chan (陳家碧), actress
 Fruit Chan, film director
 Jackie Chan, actor
 Sita Chan, singer
 David Chan Yuk-cheung, leader of Baodiao movement
 William Chang, art director, costume and production designer, film editor
 Catchick Paul Chater, businessman
 Chen Din Hwa, businessman, founder of Nam Fung Development Ltd
 Edison Chen, actor, singer
 Fala Chen, singer, actress
 Kelly Chen, singer, actress, TV presenter, movie director, commercial model
 Adam Cheng, actor
 Davi Cheng, artist
 Sammi Cheng, singer, actress, TV presenter
 Shiu-Yuen Cheng
 Yumiko Cheng, singer
 Cheng Ting Ting, artist
 Hilton Cheong-Leen, businessman and politician
 Angie Cheung
 Cecilia Cheung, singer, actress
 Cindy Cheung
 Fernando Cheung, lecturer, social worker
 Jacky Cheung, singer, actor
 Cheung Kam Ching, former head of the Department of Religion and Philosophy at Hong Kong Baptist University, currently Professor of the Department of Philosophy, The Chinese University of Hong Kong
 Leslie Cheung, singer, actor
 Maggie Cheung (Cheung Ho Yee)
 Maggie Cheung (Cheung Man Yuk), actress
 Mama Cheung, YouTuber who makes videos about cooking
 Rachel Cheung, pianist
 Steven Cheung, actor 
 Steven N. S. Cheung, economist
 Teresa Cheung (Cheung Siu Wai)
 Wallace Chung, singer, actor 
 Chin Tsi-ang, actor
 Angie Chiu, actress
 Rebecca Chiu, Asia known squash player, Hong Kong National representative
 Samson Chiu, film director
 Raymond Cho, singer, actor
 Ada Choi, actress
 Elkie Chong, singer, actress based in South Korea, best known as a member of CLC
 Agnes Chow, politician and social activist
 Raymond Chow, Hong Kong film producer
 Niki Chow, singer, actress
 Stephen Chow, actor, comedian
 Vivian Chow, DJ, actress
 York Chow
 Chow Yun-fat, actor
 Almond Chu, artist and photographer
 Athena Chu, actress
 Samuel Chu
 Winston Chu, lawyer
 Chung Sze Yuen, retired politician
 Adrienne Louise Clarkson (née Poy), journalist and stateswoman

D
Dejay Choi
Venerable Prof. K. L. Dhammajoti, Buddhist monk and director of Buddha-Dharma Centre of Hong Kong Ltd
Christopher Doyle, cinematographer, actor, photographer, and film director
Lydia Dunn, businesswoman, politician

E 
Audrey Eu, politician, former Member of the Legislative Council of Hong Kong

F
Fan Chun Yip, Asia known Hong Kong football star, Hong Kong National Representative
Rita Fan, politician
Henry Fok
Timothy Fok, businessman, politician, son of Henry Fok
 Alex Fong Chung-Sun, Hong Kong TV and film actor
 Alex Fong Lik-san, professional swimmer turned actor and singer
 Alexander Fu, actor
Fu Mingxia, female diver, multiple Olympic gold medalist
Marco Fu, world known snooker player
Frederick Fung, Chairman of the Association for Democracy and People's Livelihood
Fung Kwok Wai, Hong Kong amateur snooker player

H
Brian Hau, singer, songwriter and columnist 
Anne Heung, actress
Tom Hilditch, journalist, publisher
Albert Ho, Hong Kong Alliance in Support of Patriotic Democratic Movements in China person
Cyd Ho, politician
Denise Ho, actress, singer
Ho Sin Tung, artist
Stanley Ho, entrepreneur
Willis Ho, activist, journalist
Kuan Hsin-chi, chairman of the Civic Party
Jessica Hester Hsuan, actress
Alfred Hui, singer
 Andy Hui, actor
Ann Hui, film director
King Hu, film director
Michael Hui, actor, director, scriptwriter, producer
Sam Hui, singer, actor
Sammo Hung, actor, martial artist, film director
William Hung
Luke Hunt, journalist and author
Babar Hayat, cricketer, Hong Kong cricket team

I
Stephen Ip, politician

J

K
Lawrence Kadoorie, businessman
Michael Kadoorie, businessman
Charles K. Kao, engineer and physicist
Nicholas Kao Se Tseien, Catholic priest
James Johnstone Keswick, businessman
William Keswick
Ambrose King, sociologist, educator, writer and academic
Josephine Koo, actress
 Stuart Krohn, rugby player, lock 
Charles Kwan
Stanley Kwan, film director
Aaron Kwok, singer, dancer and actor
 Dennis Kwok, politician
Raymond Kwok, chairman and managing director of Sun Hung Kai Properties
Thomas Kwok, former joint-chairman of Sun Hung Kai Properties
Walter Kwok, businessman, formerly chairman and CEO of Sun Hung Kai Properties
Paul Kwong, Second Anglican Archbishop and Primate of Sheng Kung Hui
Peter Kwong, First Anglican Archbishop and Primate of Sheng Kung Hui
Kwok Ka Ming
Leo Ku, singer
Louis Koo, actor, singer
Nancy Kwan, actress
El Gato Krochefo, programmer, snow analyst

L
 Lucas Wong, is rapper, singer and model of Thai and Chinese descent. He is a member of the South Korean boy group NCT,  its Chinese sub-unit WayV 
 Larissa Lai, writer, critic, and professor
 Leon Lai, singer, actor 
 George Lam, singer, actor
 Raymond Lam, TVB actor and singer
 Ringo Lam Leng-tung, film director
 Sandy Lam, singer 
 Sunny Lam,, singer-songwriter
 Terence Lam,, singer-songwriter
 Douglas Lapraik, shipping and real estate magnate
 Andy Lau Tak Wah, actor and singer
 Lau Ching Wan, actor
 Emily Lau, politician
 Kurtis Lau Wai-kin, professional League of Legends video game player
 Honcques Laus, activist, utilitarian
 Nathan Law (activist and politician
 Akandu Lawrence, football player
 Allen Lee, politician
 Ambrose Lee, former Secretary for Security of Hong Kong
 Andy Lee, Hong Kong professional snooker player
 Lee Hoi-chuen, Cantonese opera actor, father of Bruce Lee and Robert Lee
 Bruce Lee, kung fu master and actor, son of Lee Hoi-chuen
 Robert Lee, musician, son of Lee Hoi-chuen
 Colleen Lee, pianist
 Hacken Lee, singer, actor
 Johnson Lee, TVB actor, impressionist
 Lee Kin Wo, Hong Kong football star, Hong Kong National Representative
 Lee Lai Shan, windsurfer, Olympic gold medalist
 Lilian Lee, novelist, best known as the author of Farewell My Concubine and Rouge
 Martin Lee, Democratic Party (Hong Kong)
 Martin Lee Ka-shing, businessman, son of Lee Shau Kee
 Peter Lee Ka-kit, businessman, son of Lee Shau Kee
 Sam Lee, actor
 Lee San San, TVB actress, winner of 1996 Miss Hong Kong Pageant
 Lee Shau Kee, tycoon and philanthropist, father of Martin Lee and Peter Lee
 Starry Lee, politician, chairperson of the DAB
 Isabella Leong Lok Sze, singer and actress
 Antony Leung, business 
 Leung Chun-ying, 3rd Chief Executive of Hong Kong
 Edward Leung, politician and activist
 Elsie Leung, solicitor
 Gigi Leung, singer, actress
 Leung Kwok-hung, political activist also known as "Long Hair" 
 Tony Leung Chiu Wai, actor, singer
 Tony Leung Ka Fai, actor
 Joey Leung Ka Yin, contemporary artist 
 Andrew Li, retired judge
 Arthur Li Kwok Cheung, Secretary for Education and Manpower
 Sir David Li, banker
 Herman Li, founder and lead guitarist of power metal band DragonForce
 Li Ka Shing, tycoon and philanthropist, father of Richard Li and Victor Li
 Richard Li, businessman, son of Li Ka Shing
 Victor Li, businessman, son of Li Ka Shing
 Shawn Liao, former basketball player and opera patron 
 Betty Loh (Loh Ti), actress
 Christine Loh, lawmaker

M
Ma Lin, biochemist and educator; Vice-Chancellor of the Chinese University of Hong Kong (CUHK) from 1978 to 1987
Ma Lik, Legislative Councillor, and was the Chairman of the Democratic Alliance for Betterment of Hong Kong
Vivek Mahbubani, stand up comedian 
Alexandra Christina Manley, first wife of Prince Joachim of Denmark
Hormusjee Naorojee Mody, businessman
Mong Man Wai, Chairman of Democratic Alliance for the Betterment of Hong Kong
Karen Mok / Karen Joy Morris, singer, actress
Moy Lin-shin, Taoist monk and founder of Taoist Tai Chi Society
Anita Mui, singer
Kenneth Ma, actor
Steven Ma, actor
Joe Ma, actor
Evergreen Mak Cheung-ching, actor
David Millar, British cyclist

N
Carl Ng, model, actor
Sandra Ng, actress, comedienne
Dorabjee Nowrojee, business
Kary Ng, singer
Ng On-yee, Hong Kong women snooker player
Ron Ng, actor, singer

O
Darryl O'Young, racing driver

P
Matt Page, British scholar currently residing in North Point
The Pancakes
Fung Chin Pang, comic artist and illustrator
Jenny Pat, Pat Lui Lui (Bi Lei Lei)
 Lord Christopher Patten, British politician and the last Governor of Hong Kong
Hong Kong Phooey
Chung-Kwong Poon, Vice-Chancellor of Hong Kong Polytechnic University
Neville Poy
Vivienne Poy (née Lee)

Q

R
Michelle Reis, actress, winner of 1988 Miss Hong Kong Beauty Pageant
Gregory Charles Rivers, actor
Ruan Lingyu, actress
Dhun Jehangir Ruttonjee
Jehangir Hormusjee Ruttonjee

S
Leslie George Santos, footballer
Victor Sassoon, businessman and hotelier
Run Run Shaw, entertainment mogul and philanthropist
Runme Shaw, chairman and founder of the Shaw Organisation of Singapore
Charmaine Sheh (佘詩曼), actress
Lydia Shum, comedian, MC, and actress
Sik Kok Kwong, Buddhist monk and first president of the Hong Kong Buddhist Association
Edwin Siu, actor, singer
Yan-kit So, food scholar and cookbook writer
Angela Su, artist
Michelle Sun, entrepreneur

T
Alan Tam, singer, actor
Patrick Tam (Tam Kar Ming)
Patrick Tam (Tam Yiu Man)
Roman Tam, singer
Alan Tang, actor
Henry Tang, businessman
Tat Ming Pair
Tsai Yuan-pei, revolutionary, educator and politician
Donald Tsang, 2nd Chief Executive of Hong Kong
John Tsang Chun-wah
Tsang Tsou Choi, calligraphy artist
Kay Tse, singer
Nicholas Tse, actor, singer
Kate Tsui, actress, singer
Kristal Tin, actress, singer
Daniel C. Tsui, physicist, awarded Nobel Prize in Physics
Tsui Hark, film director, producer, screenwriter
Johnnie To, film director, producer
Raymond To, dramatist, screenwriter & film director
Ronny Tong, politician
Tung Chao Yung, founder of Orient Overseas Container Line
Tung Chee Hwa, 1st Chief Executive of Hong Kong

U

V
David "Comedy Dave" Vitty

W
 Jackson Wang, member of the popular South Korean boy group GOT7, solo artist in China, former member of China's national fencing team
 Nina Wang (née Kung), businesswoman
 Teddy Wang, billionaire and disappeared person who was married to Nina Wang
 Wayne Wang, film director
 David Michael Webb activist, share market analyst
 Chow Kai Wing, heads the History Department at Hong Kong Baptist University
 Anthony Wong Chau Sang, actor
 Ay Wong Yiu Ming, singer
 Eleanor Wong, pianist and Senior Lecturer at The Hong Kong Academy for Performing Arts
 Carter Wong, actor and martial arts instructor
 Faye Wong, actress, singer-songwriter
 Jennifer Wong, writer, poet
 Joshua Wong (politician and activist
 Lucas Wong, entertainer, rapper and model based in South Korea and China, best known as a member of NCT and its sub-units, NCT U and WayV
 Wong Cho-lam stage actor, television actor
 Wong Kam-po, World Champion racing cyclist, Hong Kong National Representative
 Wong Kar Wai, film director, producer
 Koma Wong, vocalist, guitarist, songwriter of Beyond
 Natalie Wong (黃𨥈瑩), actress
 Race Wong, singer
 Ray Wong, activist
 Raymond Wong (Wong Yuk-man)
 Wong Wo Bik, architectural photographer
 Wong Yan Lung, barrister, judge
 John Woo, film director, screenwriter, editor
 Daniel Wu, actor, film director, screenwriter
 Wu Kwok Hung, retired Hong Kong football star, former Hong Kong National Representative
 Myolie Wu, actress

X

Y
Jack Yan
Choi Yan-chi, artist
Ti Liang Yang, retired judge
Chao Yat
Benny Yau
Sally Yeh, singer, actress
Donnie Yen, actor, martial artist, film director
Yeoh Eng Kiong
Michelle Yeoh, actress
Angela Yeung Wing, model and actress more commonly known by stage name Angelababy
Miriam Yeung, singer, actress
Yip Hon, gambling tycoon
Yim Ho
Sam Yip
Patrick Yu
Lawrence Yu (余錦基), businessman, director of Hong Kong Football Association
Tik Chi Yuen, Vice Chairman of Democratic Party (Hong Kong)
Yuen Biao, actor, producer, action choreographer
 Anita Yuen, actress, winner of 1990 Miss Hong Kong Pageant 
Corey Yuen, action director, action Choreography, director, producer
Yuen Kwok-yung, microbiologist, physician, surgeon
Yuen Wah, actor, action choreographer
Tavia Yeung, actress
Zhou Yongqin, member of the Hong Kong Progressive Alliance and the Liberal Party
Tyson Yoshi, rapper and hip hop singer

Z
Allan Zeman, businessman
Joseph Zen Ze-kiun, 6th Bishop of Hong Kong

See also

List of Governors of Hong Kong
List of Chief Secretaries of Hong Kong
Index of articles related to Hong Kong
List of Hong Kong ODI cricketers
List of graduates of University of Hong Kong
List of Chinese University of Hong Kong people
List of Hong Kong people of Shanghainese and Lower Yangtze descent
List of Hong Kong people of Sze Yap descent

References

 
 
Hong Kong